Kadabagatti is a village in Dharwad district of Karnataka, India.

Demographics 
As of the 2011 Census of India there were 379 households in Kadabagatti and a total population of 1,820 consisting of 929 males and 891 females. There were 225 children ages 0-6.

References

Villages in Dharwad district